Emotional Remains is the eighth studio album by Richard Marx which was released digitally on October 31, 2008 on Marx's website. Emotional Remains was released simultaneously with Sundown and was re-released exclusively through Amazon.com on September 22, 2009 with two new tracks.

Track listing
"From the Inside" (Marx) - 4:35
"Better or Worse" (Marx) - 4:48
"Part of Me" (Marx, Matt Scannell) - 4:14
"Through My Veins" (Marx) - 4:42
"Save Me" (Marx) - 3:49
"Come Running" (Marx, Fee Waybill) - 4:18
"Flame in Your Fire" (Marx, Randall Wallace) - 4:09
"When November Falls" (Marx, Scannell) - 4:32
"Take You Back" (Marx, Graham Colton) - 3:42
"Over My Head" (Marx) - 3:55
"Done to Me" (Marx) - 3:47

Bonus tracks
"Never Take Me Dancing" (Marx) - 5:14
"Should've Known Better" 2009 (Marx) - 4:26

Personnel
Greg Bissonette – drums
Steve Brewster – drums
Tom Bukovac – guitars
Cliff Colnot – string arrangements
J.T. Corenflos – guitars
Bruce Gaitsch – guitars
Jennifer Hanson – backing vocals
Mark Hill – bass guitar
Sean Hurley – bass guitar
Michael Landau – guitars
Teddy Landau – bass guitar
Kenny Loggins – producer, guitars, backing vocals
Kevin Marks – guitars
Brandon Marx – backing vocals
Richard Marx – producer, arrangements, lead and backing vocals, acoustic and electric guitars, keyboards, synth bass, clavinet
Chip Matthews – guitars
Jerry McPherson – guitars
Nate Morton – drums
Matt Pierson – bass guitar
Matt Scannell – producer, guitars, backing vocals
Gary Smith – keyboards
Michael Thompson – guitars
Matt Walker – drums
Jason Webb – keyboards
Glenn Worf – bass guitar

Production
David Cole – engineer
Chip Matthews – engineer
Mat Prock – engineer
Jamie Sickora – engineer
Mark Valentine – engineer

Miscellaneous
This is Marx's first studio album to not feature him on the album cover, Marx took the photo himself
This is Marx's first studio album to not have released a single
Son Brandon Marx makes an appearance on the track "Save Me"
There is no personal dedication listed on this album
The track "Take You Back" was previously released on Graham Colton's 2007 album Here Right Now
"Never Take Me Dancing" is a remake of "You Never Take Me Dancing" from Marx's 1997 Flesh And Bone album
"Should've Known Better 2009" is a remake of "Should've Known Better" from Marx's 1987 Richard Marx album

2008 albums
Richard Marx albums
Albums produced by Richard Marx
Self-released albums